The unitary method is a technique for solving a problem by first finding the value of a single unit, and then finding the necessary value by multiplying the single unit value.

Examples

For example, to solve the problem: "A man walks 7 miles in 2 hours. How far does he walk in 7 hours?", one would first calculate how far the man walks in 1 hour. One can safely assume that he would walk half the distance in half the time. Therefore, dividing by 2, the man walks 3.5 miles in 1 hour. Multiplying by 7 for 7 hours, the man walks 7×3.5=24.5 miles, or consider the distance traveled by the man be X, then divide it given distance that is 7 (x/7). It is equal to the time taken to travel X distance that is 7 hours divided by the time taken to travel 7 miles, that is 2 hours (7/2), therefore x/7=7/2, hence X=24.5 miles.

The same method can be applied to the problem: "A man walks at 4 miles per hour. How long would it take him to cover 5 miles?". Dividing by 4 shows that the man covers 1 mile in a quarter (0.25) of an hour. Multiplying by 5 shows that the man, therefore, takes 1 hour and a quarter (1.25 hours) to cover 5 miles. Similarly, by the second method, we can find the value of time taken to cover 5 miles directly.
The first method is preferable and easier.

References

External links
 http://www.math-only-math.com/unitary-method.html
 http://tutorteddy.com/the_unitary_method.php

Elementary algebra
Algebra
Arithmetic